Georgy Martirosyan may refer to:
 Georgy Martirosyan (actor)
 Georgy Martirosyan (serial killer)